Troitsk is a rural locality (a village) in Yamakayevsky Selsoviet, Blagovarsky District, Bashkortostan, Russia. The population was 161 as of 2010. There are 2 streets.

Geography 
Troitsk is located 17 km south of Yazykovo (the district's administrative centre) by road. Yamakay is the nearest rural locality.

References 

Rural localities in Blagovarsky District